Private Warren Carman (March 16, 1845 – October 17, 1894) was an English soldier who fought in the American Civil War. Carman received the  United States' highest award for bravery during combat, the Medal of Honor, for his action during the Battle of Waynesboro in Virginia on 2 March 1865. He was honored with the award on 26 March 1865.

Biography
Carman was born in England on 16 March 1845. He enlisted into the 1st New York (Lincoln) Cavalry. He died on 17 October 1894 and his remains are interred at the Mount Hope Cemetery in New York.

Medal of Honor citation

See also

 List of American Civil War Medal of Honor recipients: A–F

References

1845 births
1894 deaths
English-born Medal of Honor recipients
English emigrants to the United States
People of New York (state) in the American Civil War
Union Army officers
United States Army Medal of Honor recipients
American Civil War recipients of the Medal of Honor